Witch Hunt was a 1967 British supernatural television drama series shown on BBC2. Starring Patrick Kavanagh and Anna Palk, and unfolding over 5 episodes, the plot involves a man, Rex Fordham, who moves to the Gloucestershire countryside and uncovers a secret witchcraft cult. Written by Jon Manchip White, directed by Peter Duguid, and produced by Alan Bromly. No episodes are known to exist in the archives as of 2009.

External links
Witch Hunt (Action TV).

British supernatural television shows
1960s British drama television series
Lost television shows
English-language television shows